The 2008-09 curling season began in September 2008 and ended in April 2009.

Season of Champions top three finishes
(Only team's skip listed)

Other events

World Curling Tour winners

Women's World Curling Tour winners

WCT Money Ranking

2008-09
2008-09
Seasons in curling